The following television stations broadcast on digital or analog channel 7 in Canada:

 CFCN-TV-2 in Banff, Alberta
 CFJC-TV-11 in Quesnel, British Columbia
 CFRN-TV-7 in Lougheed, Alberta
 CFTF-DT-7 in Sept-Îles, Quebec
 CHAN-TV-3 in Squamish, British Columbia
 CHAU-DT-6 in Gaspé, Quebec
 CHBC-TV-7 in Penticton, British Columbia
 CHBX-TV-1 in Wawa, Ontario
 CHKL-TV-3 in Revelstoke, British Columbia
 CHLT-DT in Sherbrooke, Quebec
 CIII-DT-7 in Midland, Ontario
 CIPA-TV-2 in Big River, Saskatchewan
 CISA-DT in Lethbridge, Alberta
 CISR-TV-1 in Grand Forks, British Columbia
 CJCB-TV-5 in Bay St. Lawrence, Nova Scotia
 CJDG-DT in Val d'Or, Quebec
 CKCD-TV in Campbellton, New Brunswick
 CKCK-TV-7 in Fort Qu'Appelle, Saskatchewan
 CKLT-TV-2 in Boiestown, New Brunswick
 CKMJ-TV in Moose Jaw, Saskatchewan
 CKRT-DT in Rivière-du-Loup, Quebec
 CKY-DT in Winnipeg, Manitoba

07 TV stations in Canada